W. B. Ray High School is a 5A secondary school centrally located in Corpus Christi, Texas, United States and is part of the Corpus Christi Independent School District.  The school is named in honor of CCISD school board president, William Benton Ray. W. B. Ray High School opened in 1950. Ray High School is noted for its Socratic method, a system based on teacher and student interaction that promulgates discussion and inquiry-based learning in the classroom.

W. B. Ray High School one of 46 high schools in Texas designated as a World School by the International Baccalaureate Program. W. B. Ray High School is the only high school in CCISD which offers the International Baccalaureate Program and is CCISD's only program for Gifted and Talented students at the High School level, offering higher level academic courses that surpass Honors and AP courses in both rigor and difficulty.

Demographics 
With a student enrollment of approximately 2,100 students, Ray High School has an ethnic distribution of 62% Hispanic, 32% White, 5% Black, & 1% other (including Native Americans, Pacific Islanders, and Asians). The school's boundary area is varied in socio-economic strata, ranging from extremely affluent multimillion-dollar homes to multi-family complexes.

Profile 
The school principal is Roxanne Cuevas.

The school's motto is "Fighting Texans".  The mascots are "Tex" and "Mary Lou."

International Baccalaureate 
Ray's International Baccalaureate program graduated its inaugural class in 2013. Since then, graduates have been accepted for admission at some of the most prestigious academic institutions and programs in the world including Harvard, MIT, Yale, Columbia, Georgetown, NYU, Vanderbilt, Cornell, Brown, Northwestern, Tufts, Washington University in St. Louis, Stanford, Rice, Duke, the American University in Paris, and Dartmouth among others.

Extracurricular involvement 
Ray High School participates in a variety of extracurricular activities. Clubs and organizations are available in academics, service, performing arts, publications, and special interests. Competitive sports for young men and women include basketball, baseball, track, soccer, softball, wrestling, football, cross-country, swimming and diving, golf, volleyball, tennis, and recently water polo. The school's award-winning Academic Decathlon and Mock Trial teams regularly advance to the state level. The Ray Speech and Debate team is a regional powerhouse and a frequent competitor at prominent national contests.

School uniform
This school has a simple dress code: any color shirt and pants, but can not be showing (stomach, etc.) anything. Assistant principals and armed police officers guard the main hallways in search of dress code offenders. In 2000, there was a push in the administration (led by Dr. Scott at the time) to ban flip-flops, but student and parent outcry and lack of support from teachers led to this being dropped.

Athletics 

 1951-52 Set Texas state record in 440 yard relay at 42.64 seconds.
 1959-60 Won Texas State Football 4A Championship defeating Katy 20-6.

Notable alumni
 David Baxter, class of 1955, World Series of Poker winner
Charles Butt, class of 1955, Chair of the H-E-B supermarket chain
Arnold Davis, former NFL player
 Farrah Fawcett, model and actress
 Bill Glass, former NFL player
 Clint Gresham, Seattle Seahawks long snapper
 Martin Gurule, murderer and death row escapee
 Jim Heath, singer, songwriter and guitarist known by his stage name The Reverend Horton Heat
 John Kline, member of the House of Representatives
 Terrence McNally, class of 1955, was an American playwright, librettist, and screenwriter
 Kent Nix, former NFL player
 Paul Peress, drummer, composer, producer
 Larry C. Price, two-time Pulitzer Prize–winning journalist and documentary photographer
Dody Roach, class of 1955, World Series of Poker winner
 Pepe Serna, actor
 Susan Taylor (aka Taylor Pie), singer/songwriter, member of the Pozo-Seco Singers
 Chris Layton, member of Stevie Ray Vaughan's band, Double Trouble
 Bart Shirley, former MLB player (LA Dodgers & NY Mets)

References

External links

 W.B. Ray Class of 1964 alumni website
 W.B. Ray class of 1967 reunion website
  W.B. Ray Percussion website

Corpus Christi Independent School District high schools
Educational institutions established in 1950
High schools in Corpus Christi, Texas
1950 establishments in Texas